The British Journal of Criminology is a bi-monthly peer-reviewed criminology and law journal focusing on British and international criminology. It is published by Oxford University Press on behalf of the Centre for Crime and Justice Studies and its editor-in-chief is Eamonn Carrabine.

Abstracting and indexing 

According to the Journal Citation Reports, the journal has a 2016 impact factor of 1.818, ranking it 19th out of 58 journals in the category "Criminology & Penology". 2.881 in 2020.

References

External links 
 

Bimonthly journals
British law journals
English-language journals
Publications established in 1960
Criminology journals